The 1974 National Rowing Championships was the third edition of the National Championships, held from 20–21 July 1974 at the National Water Sports Centre in Holme Pierrepont, Nottingham. There was a record entry of 330 crews. Leander won the John Player Trophy (men's Victor Ludorum) and Civil Service won the Charlton Cup (women's Victor Ludorum).

Senior

Medal summary

Lightweight

Medal summary

Junior

Medal summary 

Key

References 

British Rowing Championships
British Rowing Championships
British Rowing Championships